Evghenia Ablovatchi (born 28 October 1981) is a Moldovan former professional tennis player.

Born in 1981, Ablovatchi trained as a junior in the Netherlands and played on the professional tour for three years, reaching a career high singles ranking of 552 in the world. She was ranked as high as 350 in doubles and won an ITF doubles title in Le Touquet in 2002.

Ablovatchi featured in eight Fed Cup ties for Moldova, four in 1998 and four in 1999. She won a total of seven rubbers, four of which came in singles.

ITF finals

Doubles: 3 (1–2)

References

External links
 
 
 

1981 births
Living people
Moldovan female tennis players